The Danube Flotilla  was naval formation of the British Mediterranean Fleet from 1919 to 1926.

History
The British Naval Mission in Serbia, formed in 1914, was involved in the Serbian Campaign of World War I against the Austro-Hungarian Empire. Its flag ship was HMS Gloworm  an Insect-class gunboat that was designed for use in shallow rivers or inshore and they were intended for use on the River Danube towards the end of World War I.

The flotilla was operating out of Baja, Hungary under the command of Captain Vernon Haggard in 1919. The flotilla was disbanded in 1926.

Senior Officers, commanding

References

Bibliography
 Admiralty, Great Britain (April 1920). "Flag Officers in Commission". Navy List. London England: HM Stationery Office. 
  Admiralty, Great Britain (January 1921). "Flag Officers in Commission". Navy List. London England: HM Stationery Office.
  Admiralty, Great Britain (January 1923). "Flag Officers in Commission". Navy List. London England: HM Stationery Office.
  Admiralty, Great Britain (July 1924). "Flag Officers in Commission". Navy List. London England: HM Stationery Office.
  Herwig, Holger H. (2014). The First World War: Germany and Austria-Hungary 1914-1918. London England: A&C Black. .
 Imperial War Museums (1919). Greenwich, London, England: Imperial War Museums UK.
 Kemp, Paul J. "'My Futile Mission': Captain Vernon Haggard and the Danube Flotilla, 1919". Imperial War Museum Review 2 (1987).
 Miklós, Lojkó (1995). British policy on Hungary, 1918-1919 : a documentary sourcebook. London England: School of Slavonic and East European Studies. 
 Sondhaus, Lawrence (2011). World War One: The Global Revolution. Cambridge England: Cambridge University Press. .

Royal Navy flotillas
Military units and formations of the Royal Navy in World War I
Military units and formations established in 1919
Military units and formations disestablished in 1926